Dickinson is a surname and, rarely, a given name.

People surnamed Dickinson
(The list is sorted by year of birth)

Born 1600–1699
 Nathaniel Dickinson (pioneer) (1601–1676), founder of Hadley, Massachusetts
 Jonathan Dickinson (1663–1722), Philadelphia mayor

Born 1700–1799
 John Dickinson (1732–1808), U.S. solicitor, politician and Founding Father
 Philemon Dickinson (1739–1809), American lawyer, politician and soldier
 John Dean Dickinson (1767–1841), U.S. lawyer, banker and politician
 Charles Dickinson (historical figure) (1780–1806), American attorney and duelist
 John Dickinson (inventor) (1782–1869), British papermaking inventor
 Townsend Dickinson (1795–1851), associate justice of the Arkansas Supreme Court

Born 1800–1899
 Almaron Dickinson (1800–1836), Texan soldier, died defending the Alamo
 Daniel S. Dickinson (1800–1866), U.S. Senator from New York
 Andrew B. Dickinson (1801–1873), New York politician, U.S. Minister to Nicaragua
 Edward Dickinson (1803–1874), U.S. Congressman from Massachusetts, father of poet Emily Dickinson
 David W. Dickinson (1808–1845), U.S. Congressman from Tennessee
 Susanna Dickinson (1814–1883), Alamo survivor, wife of Almaron Dickinson
 Margaret Rebecca Dickinson (1821 - 1918), British botanical artist
 George Dickinson (Canterbury cricketer) (1828–1913), New Zealand cricketer
 Edward F. Dickinson (1829–1874), American lawyer, soldier and politician
 Emily Dickinson (1830–1886), American poet
 Lavinia Norcross Dickinson (1833–1899), sister of Emily who enabled her publication
 Anna Elizabeth Dickinson (1842–1932), American lecturer on slavery and discrimination against women
 Charles M. Dickinson (1842–1924), American lawyer, newspaper editor, and diplomat from New York
 Donald M. Dickinson (1846–1917), American lawyer and politician, 34th US Postmaster General
 John Dickenson (Canadian politician) (1847–1932)
 Jacob M. Dickinson (1851–1928), U.S. Secretary of War, founder of Sigma Alpha Epsilon
 Frances Dickinson (physician) (1856–1945), American physician, clubwoman
 Willoughby Dickinson, 1st Baron Dickinson (1859–1943), British politician, peace activist
 Robert Latou Dickinson (1861–1950), American obstetrician, artist and research scientist
 Fairleigh S. Dickinson (c.1862–1948), American co-founder of Becton Dickinson
 Lester J. Dickinson (1873–1968), American politician, senator from Iowa
 Marvin M. Dickinson (1877–1951), American football and baseball player and coach
 George Sherman Dickinson (1888–1964), American developer of Dickinson library classification
 Edwin Dickinson (1891–1978), American painter and draftsman
 Velvalee Dickinson (1893–c.1980), American World War II spy for Japan
 Maggie Dickinson (1894–1949), Australian ballet dancer
 Leonard R. Dickinson (1898-1994), American busimessman and politician

Born 1900–1949
 George Dickinson (1903–1978), New Zealand international cricketer and rugby union player
 William Boyd Dickinson (1908–1978), U.S. war correspondent, editor of the Philadelphia Bulletin
 Jacob Alan Dickinson (1911–1971), U.S. lawyer, desegregation advocate
 Ben Dickinson Samuel Benson Dickinson (1912–2000), Australian geologist
 Basil Dickinson (1915–2013), Australian athlete
 Peter Dickinson (architect) (1925–1961), British-Canadian architect
 Jimmy Dickinson (1925–1982), English football player
 William L. Dickinson (born 1925), U.S. representative for Alabama
 Peter Dickinson (1927–2015), English author and poet
 William R. Dickinson (born 1930), American geologist, geoscientist and academic
 Angie Dickinson (born 1931), American actress
 Nate Dickinson (born 1932), American wildlife biologist
 David Dickinson (born 1941), English antiques expert and television presenter
 Jim Dickinson (1941–2009) American record producer, pianist, and singer
 Terence Dickinson (born 1943), Canada
 Linda Spalding née Linda Dickinson, U.S. and Canadian author
 Jess H. Dickinson (born 1947), Presiding Justice of the Supreme Court of Mississippi
 Sandra Dickinson (born 1948), American-British actress

Born 1950–1999
 James Dickinson (taxidermist) (born 1950), English taxidermist
 Charles Dickinson (author) (born 1951), American writer
 Q. Todd Dickinson (1952–2020), American lawyer
 Janice Dickinson (born 1955), American model, photographer, author and talent agent
 Arlene Dickinson (born 1956), South African – Canadian businesswoman
 Bruce Dickinson (born 1958), British vocalist for the heavy metal band Iron Maiden
 Amy Dickinson (born 1959), American newspaper columnist
 Brian Dickinson (born 1961), Canadian pianist
 Rob Dickinson (born 1965), British musician and singer-songwriter
 Helen Dickinson (born 1966), British chief executive
 Brian Dickinson (climber) (born 1974), American mountain climber
 Oliver Dickinson (born 1980), Anglo-French documentary film director
 Carl Dickinson (born 1987), English footballer
 Jason Dickinson (born 1995), professional ice hockey player
 Ellie Dickinson (born 1998), English cyclist
 James Charles (internet personality) né James Charles Dickinson (born 1999), internet personality

Pseudonyms and aliases
 Angie Dickinson, born 'Angeline Brown' in 1931, United States
 Christine Arnothy (born 1934), Hungary, used the pen name 'William Dickinson'

See also

Human name disambiguation pages
 David Dickinson (disambiguation)
 John Dickinson (disambiguation)
 William Dickinson (disambiguation)

People sharing the given name Dickinson
 Dickinson W. Richards (1895–1973), United States

Notes

English-language surnames
Surnames of English origin
Patronymic surnames
Surnames from given names